Hyper-radial or hyperradiant Fresnel lenses are Fresnel lenses used in lighthouses. They are larger than "first-order" lenses, having a focal length (radius) of 1330 mm (52.36 inches). The idea was mentioned by Thomas Stevenson in 1869 and first proposed by John Richardson Wigham in 1872, and again proposed by Thomas Stevenson in 1885 (infringing Wigham's patent).

The hyper-radial lens was made in 1885 by the F. Barbier Company in Paris as a test lens for the lighthouse illumination trials then going on at the South Foreland Lighthouse in the United Kingdom (UK). Chance Brothers Glass Company made their first hyper-radial lens in 1887 in the UK.

These lenses were originally named biform, and later triform and quadriform lenses, by Wigham. Thomas Stevenson used the term hyperradiant lens, and later they were renamed the hyper-radial lens by James Kenward of the Chance Brothers Glass Company.

The hyper-radial Fresnel lenses were the largest ever put into use and were installed in about two dozen major "landfall" beacons around the world. The recipients include Makapu'u Point lighthouse on Oahu Island in Hawaii, Cabo de São Vicente in Portugal, Manora Point in Karachi, Pakistan, the Bishop Rock off the coast of Cornwall (in the UK), Cabo de Santa Marta in Brazil, and Cape Race, Newfoundland. By the 1920s, high-intensity lamp technology had rendered lenses of this size obsolete.

Lighthouses

Hyperradiant optics were installed in thirty-one lighthouses around the world. A large proportion were destined for lights around Great Britain and Ireland, with another four used at sites around Sri Lanka. Despite the improvements in lighting technology, a number are still in use today. Others are in museums, either on display or in storage. The remainder have been broken up or lost.

References

External links

 Wikimap showing lighthouse locations
 Makapuu Point

Lenses
History of physics
Lighthouse fixtures